The 2004 European Junior Judo Championships is an edition of the European Junior Judo Championships, organised by the International Judo Federation. It was held in Sofia, Bulgaria from 10 to 12 September 2004.

Medal summary

Medal table

Men's events

Women's events

Source Results

References

External links
 

 U21
European Junior Judo Championships
European Championships, U21
Judo
Judo competitions in Bulgaria
Judo
Judo, European Championships U21